Akarsu is a village in Tarsus  district of Mersin Province, Turkey. At    it is situated in Çukurova (Cilicia of the antiquity) plains at the east bank of Berdan River. The population of Akarsu  is 431  as of 2011.

References

Villages in Tarsus District